Kosaka Dam is an embankment dam on the Kosaka river in the Saku, Nagano, Japan, completed in 1972. The primary purpose is flood control, because villages in the Kosaka River basin suffered heavy damage from the floods.

References 

Dams in Nagano Prefecture
Dams completed in 1972